Liberal Conspiracy was a British left-wing political blog established in November 2007 and edited by Sunny Hundal. Writing in The Guardian, Hundal claimed he set up the site to help "think past single-issue campaigns and work together to push a progressive agenda for Britain ... We have to rebuild the grassroots and translate that into political action by using the web".

Content has been produced by about 250 contributors, and at its peak the blog recorded 180,000 unique visitors in July 2011, as reported by Hundal to website journalism.co.uk. The site was designed by Hundal and Robert Sharp.

On 25 October 2013 Sunny Hundal announced that he no longer had the time to maintain Liberal Conspiracy as a daily-updated blog, and that "the market for opinion is over-saturated", so the website would become an occasionally updated personal blog.

References

External links
 Liberal Conspiracy

British political blogs
Internet properties established in 2007
Left-wing politics in the United Kingdom